Common names: Tibetan pit viper, Strauch's pitviper.

Gloydius strauchi is a species of venomous pit viper in the subfamily Crotalinae of the family Viperidae. The species is native to western China. It is a small snake with a pattern of four longitudinal stripes, although some older specimens may be a uniform black. G. strauchi may be distinguished from G. monticola by its higher midbody dorsal scale count. No subspecies were recognized as being valid, until a recent publication (Kai Wang et al., 2019) re-evaluated the taxonomic statuses of populations of G. strauchi and described the eastern Tibetan populations as a new species.

Etymology
The specific name, strauchi, is in honor of Russian herpetologist Alexander Strauch.

Description
The snout is rounded while the head is not too much wider than the neck. The body is moderately stout.

Scalation usually includes 21 rows of keeled dorsal scales at midbody, although the keels on the outer scale rows may be missing; 145-175 ventral scales; and 34-44 paired subcaudal scales. Also there are usually 7 supralabial scales.

The color pattern consists of a greenish brown, yellowish brown, or nut brown ground color, which is overlaid with four longitudinal stripes that are interrupted at intervals, sometimes curving and coalescing, and at other times forming an irregularly spotted or zigzag pattern. This pattern is clearly visible in young specimens, while older ones are dark or even uniformly black. A dark postocular stripe is present that more or less diffuses with the ground color above, but is clearly bordered below by a pale coloration of the lower temporal scales and posterior supralabial scales.

Geographic range
G. strauchi is found in western China in the Tibetan Plateau in the provinces of Tsinghai and western Szechwan. The type locality given is "Dytschu, also den Oberlauf des Jan-tse-kiang... Tung-o-lo (Kamennoe Nagorie) und Daudsen-lu (Szytschuan)". Zhao & Adler (1993) give "Dytschu (= Moron Us and Tuotuo rivers?), upper Jan-tse-kiang (= Jinsha River, or upper Chang Jiang), Qinghai Prov., Tung-o-lo (= Dong-e-lo) and Daudsen-lu (or Ta-tsian-lu, = Kangding Co.), Sichuan Prov., China". Pope (1935) "restricted" the type locality to "Tungngolo" (located between Lit'ang and K'angting, Hsikang, China).

It jointly holds the altitude record for pitvipers together with Crotalus triseriatus in Mexico.

References

External links

strauchi
Snakes of China
Endemic fauna of China
Reptiles described in 1912